Ravager or Ravagers may refer to:

Ravager (DC Comics), a DC comics character
The Ravagers (comics), a team name
Ravager (film), a 1997 film starring Bruce Payne
Ravager, a starship in Star Wars: Knights of the Old Republic II – The Sith Lords
Ravagers (film), a 1979 film directed by Richard Compton and based on the novel by Robert Edmond Alter
The Ravagers (novel), a 1964 novel by Donald Hamilton featuring secret agent Matt Helm
The Ravagers (film), a 1965 film directed by Eddie Romero
HMS Ravager, a ship of the Royal Navy.
The Ravagers, a faction of space marauders in the Guardians of the Galaxy films and TV series.
Ravager, a mob from Minecraft

See also 
Ravage (disambiguation)